Jessore Institute Public Library is a public library in Jessore Town founded in 1854. It is one of the oldest libraries in South Asia.

History
Jessore Public Library was founded in 1854 by R. C. Rex. the district tax collector, in a central location of Jessore Town. R. C. Rex received funding from the local elites such as the indigo planters and local zamindars of Narail and Naldanga. The library became a centre of social and literary gathering in Jessore. The library had a billiard room. Jessore town developed around the library, the Jessore Town hall was built in 1904 and Arya Theatre in 1919. Roy Bahadur Jadunath Majumdar combined the public library with Arya Theatre and the Town Club in 1927 to form a combined cultural and community centre for Jessore. This created the Jessore institute which was renamed by the government to Jessore Institute Public Library.

In 1928, the library moved to a new building which was financed by Abinashchandra Sarker, a lawyer, The library hall has was named Biswnath Hall after the father of Abinashchandra Sarker. In 1942 the library compound was taken over by the Royal Indian Air Force as part of preparations for World War II. The library started functioning again as a library after the end of World War II. The library needed renovation following its use as a military base and the partition of India. In 1953 funds were provided by the United Front government of East Pakistan. In 1978 the Khulna Divisional Development Board build a new Book Bank Hall for the library. The library has 67,197 books. The library had 49,306 Bengali books and 17,391 books in English language. The rest of the books are in Arabic, Persian language, and Urdu. The library has ancient manuscripts written in palm leaves including Shrikrishna Daipayana, the writer of the Hindu epic Mahabharata.

References

Research institutes in Bangladesh
1854 establishments in India
Organisations based in Jessore
Libraries in Bangladesh
Libraries established in 1854